The Misericordia Community Hospital is an acute care hospital located in west Edmonton, Alberta, Canada. The Misericordia is home to the Institute for Reconstructive Sciences in Medicine (iRSM), a facility for reconstruction of the face, head and neck.

The original Misericordia Hospital was established in 1900 by the Congregation of the Sisters of Misericorde, a religious congregation dedicated to nursing the poor and unwed mothers.  The Sisters of Misericorde operated the hospital until the 1970s. The hospital is now part of Covenant Health, a Catholic health care provider operating 18 facilities across Alberta, in cooperation with Alberta Health Services.

History
The hospital as an organization was founded in 1900, and it used rented facilities in its early years. Its first dedicated building opened in 1906 on the northwest corner of Hardisty Avenue and 11th Street (modern 98th Avenue and 111 Street in Oliver). It moved to its new building in West Meadowlark Park upon its completion in 1969.

Main services
The Misericordia Community Hospital offers a wide range of services.
24-hour Emergency Care
General Medicine and Surgery
Orthopedics
Urology
Plastic Surgery
Intensive and Coronary Care
Pediatrics
Geriatrics
Mental Health
Women's Health
Diagnostics
Ambulatory Care

References

External links
  

Certified airports in Alberta
Edmonton Metropolitan Region
Heliports in Canada
Catholic hospitals in North America
Hospitals established in 1900
Hospitals in Edmonton